Everingham railway station was a station on the Selby to Driffield Line in the East Riding of Yorkshire, England serving the hamlet of Harswell. It opened as Harswell Gate in 1853 and was renamed Everingham on 1 September 1874. It closed on 20 September 1954.

References

External links
 Everingham station on navigable 1947 O. S. map
 

Disused railway stations in the East Riding of Yorkshire
Former North Eastern Railway (UK) stations
Railway stations in Great Britain opened in 1853
Railway stations in Great Britain closed in 1954